Khurshidabonu Abduraufova (born 31 July 2003) is an Uzbek rhythmic gymnast, member of the national group.

Career 
Abduraufova took up the sport in 2009. In 2021 she competed in the Asian Championships in Tashkent, ending 12th in the All-Around and 7th with ribbon. In 2022 she entered the senior national group, debuting at the World Cup in Tashkent, winning silver in the All-Around and with 5 hoops as well as gold with 3 ribbons and 2 balls. A week later the group competed in Baku, ending 6th in the All-Around, 7th with 5 hoops and 3 ribbons and 2 balls. In June she took part in the World Cup in Pesaro, taking 8th place in the All-Around and 7th with 5 hoops. She was then selected for the Asian Championships in Pattaya, winning gold in teams, the All-Around and with 3 ribbons and 2 balls and silver with 5 hoops. In August Khurshidabonu competed at the 2021 Islamic Solidarity Games in Konya where the group won silver in the All-Around and with 3 ribbons and 2 balls, gold with 5 hoops. 

In September Abduraufova took part in the World Championships in Sofia along Nilufar Azamova, Nargiza Djumaniyazova, Shakhzoda Ibragimova, Mumtozabonu Iskhokzoda, Mariya Pak, and the two individuals Takhmina Ikromova and Yosmina Rakhimova, taking 18th place in the All-Around, 13th with 5 hoops and 20th with 3 ribbons + 2 balls.

References 

Living people
2003 births
Uzbekistani rhythmic gymnasts